Acacia newbeyi is a shrub of the genus Acacia and the subgenus Pulchellae that is endemic to an area of south western Australia.

Description
It blooms from July to August and produces yellow flowers. The rudimentary inflorescences are located on single headed racemes and have spherical flower-heads containing 10 to 13 pale yellow coloured flowers. The glossy seeds inside have an oblong to elliptic shape with a length of

Taxonomy
The species was first formally described by the botanist Bruce Maslin in 1975 as a part of the work Studies in the genus Acacia (Mimosaceae) - A Revision of Series Pulchellae as published in the journal Nuytsia. It was reclassified by Leslie Pedley in 2003 as Racosperma newbeyi then transferred back to genus ''Acacia in 2006.

Distribution
It is native to an area in the Wheatbelt and Great Southern regions of Western Australia where it is found growing in gravelly lateritic soils. The range of the plant extends from around Nyabing to near Boxwood Hill in the west to west of Ravensthorpe in the east where it is often a part of tall, occasionally open, shrubland communities that are often dominated by species of mallee.

See also
 List of Acacia species

References

newbeyi
Acacias of Western Australia
Taxa named by Bruce Maslin
Plants described in 1975